The Topuni River is a river of the Northland Region of New Zealand's North Island. It flows generally south, with most of its length being through a drowned valley in the northeast of the Kaipara Harbour system. The Topuni River reaches the Oruawharo River — an arm of the Kaipara — 10 kilometres northwest of Wellsford.

See also
List of rivers of New Zealand

References

Kaipara District
Rivers of the Northland Region
Rivers of New Zealand
Kaipara Harbour catchment